The Virgin Diaries is a reality TV show produced by Tiger Aspect Productions for MTV UK. Each episode follows young adults between the ages of 16 and 18 as they contemplate sex, sexuality, and their own virginity. The show was criticised by psychiatrists and teen experts.

Participants
Episode 1 - Chervana
Episode 2 - Craig
Episode 3 - Nicola
Episode 4 - Liam
Episode 5 - Mark
Episode 6 - Charlotte
Episode 7 - Sophia
Episode 8 - Jack
Episode 9 - Sam
Episode 10 - Debbie

Spin-off
A spin-off series entitled The Bedroom Diaries began airing on MTVUK on 4 February 2008. Following a similar format, the series features one young person per episode as they discuss their bedroom antics.

References

2006 British television series debuts
2006 British television series endings
MTV original programming
Television series by Tiger Aspect Productions
Television series by Endemol